KRSH is a commercial radio station in Healdsburg, California, broadcasting to the Santa Rosa, California, area on 95.9 FM.

KRSH airs an adult album alternative music format branded as "The Krush". The previous format was Top 40/CHR branded as SEXY 95.9 KSXY.

External links
Official Website

Adult album alternative radio stations in the United States
Healdsburg, California
Mass media in Sonoma County, California
RSH
Radio stations established in 1993
1993 establishments in California